8A, VIII-A or 8a may refer to :
 Aisle 8A, the 64th episode of the animated situation comedy King of the Hill
 Bone morphogenetic protein 8A in biochemistry
 Cyg OB2 -8A, a blue star
 Greek National Road 8A
 GCR Class 8A, a class of British 0-8-0 steam locomotive
 Isotta Fraschini Tipo 8A, a successor to the Tipo 8 model car
 Massachusetts Route 8A
 Nevada State Route 8A
 Secondary State Highway 8A (Washington)
 Stalag VIII-A, a German prisoners of war camp
and also :
 Atlas Blue IATA airline designator
 8(a) Business Development Program a loan program administered by the U.S. Small Business Administration

See also
A8 (disambiguation)